Democracy and Autonomy (DemA) is a political party in Italy, based in Campania. Its founder and leader is Luigi de Magistris, former mayor of Naples and former MEP for Italy of Values.

History
DemA was launched as an association by Mayor of Naples, Luigi de Magistris, and his associates in 2015.

In the Naples municipal election DemA (7.6%) was among the lists which supported Luigi de Magistris re-election as mayor (42.8% in the first round and 66.9% in the run-off). Its local partners were Naples in Common to the Left (a joint list of Italian Left, Possible, The Other Europe, the Communist Refoundation Party, the Italian Communist Party and Green Italia), the Federation of the Greens, the Democratic Republicans, Italy of Values, the Party of the South and six civic lists.

In December 2018, De Magistris launched a new political coalition of left-wing political organizations, with the intention of running in the 2019 European election.

References

External links
Official website

2015 establishments in Italy
Autonomism
Autonomy
Democratic socialist parties in Europe
Ecosocialist parties
Left-wing politics in Italy
Organisations based in Naples
Political parties established in 2017
Political parties in Campania
Progressive parties
Socialist parties in Italy